Henry Howson (15 July 1877 – 15 March 1954) was an Australian rules footballer who played with South Melbourne in the Victorian Football League (VFL).

Notes

External links 

1877 births
1954 deaths
Australian rules footballers from Victoria (Australia)
Sydney Swans players
South Yarra Football Club players